Dennis Conta (born March 24, 1940) is an American politician and consultant.

Born in Milwaukee, Wisconsin, Conta graduated from Casimir Pulaski High School. He served in the United States Army 1962-1964 He received his bachelor's degree from Ripon College and his master's degrees from Harvard University and University of Wisconsin–Milwaukee. He served in the Wisconsin State Assembly as a Democratic until 1976, when he was appointed Secretary of the Wisconsin Department of Revenue. In 1979, he left government to form a consulting and management business: Conta&Associates.

Notes

Politicians from Milwaukee
Ripon College (Wisconsin) alumni
Harvard University alumni
University of Wisconsin–Milwaukee alumni
Businesspeople from Milwaukee
1940 births
Living people
Democratic Party members of the Wisconsin State Assembly